The Jack-Knife Man is a 1920 American silent drama film directed by King Vidor and his debut film with First National. A story of Christian charity and the virtues of self-help, the work reflects his "Creed and Pledge", a declaration of his artistic principles published the same year. Prints of the film survive in several film archives.

Plot
As described in a film magazine, Peter Lane (Turner), known as the "jack-knife man" because he spends his time whittling objects from wood, selling them to earn a living, loves and is loved by the Widow Potter (Leighton), desisting from matrimony for reasons known only to himself. When a hungry child, "Buddy," comes to his houseboat in quest of food, Peter asks and receives the aid of the Widow Potter. Returning to the boat he finds the boy's mother, dying, and he buries her and adopts the boy. A while later a tramp, "Booge," joins the queer family and refuses to be ousted. The three become inseparable companions. Then a busybody parson seizes the boy and insists on finding a home for him, placing him with the Widow Potter. Time passes and Peter becomes widely sought as a maker of wooden toys. After some developments of a startling nature, his financial position improves, and Peter marries the widow and all are happy.

Cast
 F. A. Turner as Peter Lane (credited as Fred Turner)
 Harry Todd as 'Booge'
 Bobby Kelso as 'Buddy'
 Willis Marks as Rasmer Briggles
 Lillian Leighton as Widow Potter
 James Corrigan as George Rapp
 Claire McDowell as Lize Merdin (credited as Claire MacDowell)
 Charles Arling as The Doctor
 Florence Vidor as Mrs. Marcia Montgomery
 Irene Yeager as Susie (credited as Irene Yaeger)
 Carol Marshall as Jane
 Anna Dodge as Undetermined Role (credited as Mrs. George Hernandez)

Production
The Jack Knife Man was the first picture filmed at Vidor's newly constructed 15-acre studio, "Vidor Village" in Hollywood, California. The new studio was part of a joint venture by King Vidor and First National to create films, independent of the major studios, to show at First National's numerous theaters.  Vidor paid for the construction of Vidor Village with a portion  his $75,000 advance from the exhibitors. Exterior scenes were filmed in Stockton, California.

Theme

Vidor issued his "Creed and Pledge" in Variety magazine shortly before directing The Jack-Knife Man, a manifesto of his artistic and social ideals inspired by the precepts of  Christian Science:
I believe in the motion picture that carries a message to humanity.

I believe in the picture that will help humanity to free itself from the shackles of fear and suffering that have so long bound it in chains.

I will not knowingly produce a picture that contains anything that i do not believe to be absolutely true to human nature, anything that could injure anyone or anything unclean in thought or action.

Nor will I deliberately portray anything to cause fright, suggest fear, glorify mischief, condone cruelty or extenuate malice.

I will never picture evil or wrong, except to prove the fallacy of its line.

So long as I direct pictures, i will make only those founded on the principles of right, and I will endeavor to draw upon the inexhaustible source of good for my stories, my guidance and my inspiration.
A story of human redemption, the protagonists are rewarded with ultimate success, but only after a bitter struggle with nature in a desolate and threatening landscape, reflecting Vidor's own "ambivalence towards nature".

Despite a number of humorous interludes and the happy ending, the overall effect of the film is one of "relentless realism".

Footnotes

References
Brownlow, Kevin and Kobal, John. 1979. Hollywood: The Pioneers. Alfred A. Knopf Inc. A Borzoi Book, New York. 
Durgnat, Raymond and Simmon, Scott. 1988. King Vidor, American. University of California Press, Berkeley. 
Callahan, Dan. 2007. Vidor, King. Senses of Cinema. February 2007, Issue 42 http://sensesofcinema.com/2007/great-directors/vidor/ Retrieved June 10, 2020.

External links

1920 films
1920 drama films
Silent American drama films
American silent feature films
American black-and-white films
Films directed by King Vidor
First National Pictures films
1920s American films